Super Buddies is a 2013 American superhero comedy film. It is the seventh and final installment in the Air Buddies film series, and the fourteenth and final film of the overall Air Bud franchise. It was released on August 27, 2013.

Plot
The Buddies find five magical rings from the planet Inspiron. Each one gives them unique superpowers. Budderball gets super strength, Buddha gets mind-control, RoseBud gets super speed, B-Dawg gets super elasticity, and MudBud gets invisibility. Together, the Buddies must use the rings responsibly with the help of Megasis/Captain Canine in order to stop a power-hungry extraterrestrial warlord named Commander Drex, who wants to take the rings for his own and full dictatorship of Inspiron. The Buddies soon learn that they don't need to have superpowers to become superheroes.

Cast

Live-action
John Ratzenberger as Marvin "Gramps" Livingstone
Trey Loney as Bartleby Livingstone
Veronica Diaz-Carranza as Sofia Ramirez
Jay Brazeau as Mr. Swanson
Jason Earles as Jack Schaeffer
Jonathan Morgan Heit as Pete
Harley Graham as Alice
Darien Provost as Sam
Sam Adler as Billy
Michael Teigen as Sheriff Dan
Jake Brennan as Young Jack Sharffer
Kimberley Sustad as Joanne
Sean Mathieson as Todd

Voices
Cooper Roth as B-Dawg
Jeremy Shinder as Budderball
Tenzing Norgay Trainor as Buddha
G. Hannelius as Rosebud
Ty Panitz as Mudbud
Colin Hanks as Megasis/Captain Canine

Fiona Gubelmann as Princess Jorala
John Michael Higgins as Drex
Tim Conway as Deputy Sniffer
Michael Teigen as Sheriff Dan
Maulik Pancholy as Curly
Chris Coppola as Mr. Bull
Amy Sedaris as Betty
Debra Jo Rupp as Cow
Alyson Stoner as Strawberry
Zendaya as Lollipop
Atticus Shaffer as Monk-E
Brian T. Finney as Dog
Tatiana Gudegast as Cat
Justin Roiland as Chihuahua

Release

Home media
Super Buddies was released on DVD, Blu-ray, and as a film download on August 27, 2013. The physical release was produced in 2 different packages: a 2-disc Blu-ray / DVD combo pack and a 1-disc DVD. The film download was produced in both standard and high definition.

External links

2013 direct-to-video films
American direct-to-video films
American comedy films
2010s English-language films
Disney direct-to-video films
American children's films
Films about dogs
American superhero films
Films directed by Robert Vince
Air Bud (series)
2013 films
2010s American films